Angelika Mach (born 7 September 1991) is a Polish long-distance runner. In 2020, she competed in the women's half marathon at the 2020 World Athletics Half Marathon Championships held in Gdynia, Poland.

References

External links 
 

Living people
1991 births
Place of birth missing (living people)
Polish female middle-distance runners
Polish female long-distance runners
Polish female marathon runners
Athletes (track and field) at the 2020 Summer Olympics
Olympic athletes of Poland